Sara Diane Wheeler  (born 20 March 1961) is an English travel author and biographer, noted for her accounts of polar regions.

Biography 

Sara Wheeler was brought up in Bristol, England, and studied Classics and Modern Languages at Brasenose College, University of Oxford. After writing about her travels on the Greek island of Euboea and in Chile, she was accepted by the US National Science Foundation as their first female writer-in-residence at the South Pole, and spent seven months in Antarctica.

In her resultant book Terra Incognita: Travels in Antarctica, she mentioned sleeping in the captain’s bunk in Scott's Hut. Whilst in Antarctica she read The Worst Journey in the World, an account of the Terra Nova Expedition, and she later wrote a biography of its author, Apsley Cherry-Garrard.

In 1999 she was elected a Fellow of the Royal Society of Literature. From 2005 to 2009 she served as Trustee of the London Library.

She was frequently abroad for two years, travelled to Russia, Alaska, Greenland, Canada and North Norway to write her book The Magnetic North: Travels in the Arctic. A journalist at the Daily Telegraph in the UK called it a  "snowstorm of historical, geographical and anthropological facts".

In a 2012 BBC Radio 4 series: To Strive and Seek, she told the personal stories of five various members of the Terra Nova Expedition.

O My America!: Second Acts in a New World records the lives of women who travelled to America in the first half of the 19th century: Fanny Trollope, Fanny Kemble, Harriet Martineau, Rebecca Burlend, Isabella Bird, and Catherine Hubback, and the author's travels in pursuit of them.

Travel books
Evia: Travels on an Undiscovered Greek Island (1992) 
Chile: Travels in a Thin Country (1994) 
Terra Incognita: Travels in Antarctica (1997) 
The Magnetic North: Travels in the Arctic (2010) 
Access All Areas: Selected Writings 1990–2010 (2011) 
Mud and Stars: Travels in Russia with Pushkin, Tolstoy, and Other Geniuses of the Golden Age (2019)

Bibliography
Cherry: A Life of Apsley Cherry-Garrard (2002) 
Too Close to the Sun: The Life and Times of Denys Finch Hatton (2006) 
O My America!: Second Acts in a New World (2013)

Children's book
Dear Daniel: Letters from Antarctica (1997)

References 

1961 births
Living people
Alumni of Brasenose College, Oxford
Writers from Bristol
Fellows of the Royal Society of Literature
British women travel writers
British travel writers
Travel broadcasters
British biographers